San Luis is a province of Argentina located near the geographical center of the country (on the 32° South parallel). Neighboring provinces are, from the north clockwise, La Rioja, Córdoba, La Pampa, Mendoza and San Juan.

History

The city of San Luis was founded in 1594 by Luis Jufré de Loaysa y Meneses, but was subsequently abandoned. It was refounded  by Martín García Óñez de Loyola in 1596 under the name San Luis de Loyola.

Since the return of Argentina to democratic rule in 1983, in particular, the Rodríguez Saá family (of Peronist affiliation) has occupied the governor's seat. Governor (now Senator) Adolfo Rodríguez Saá has overseen investment by light manufacturers (mostly food-processors and bottling plants) and advances like the construction of Argentina's most extensive expressway network.

Economy
San Luis' economy has, over the past generation, been among the most improved in Argentina. Its 2006 output, estimated at US$3.386 billion, yielded a per capita income of US$9,203 (somewhat above the national average).

Demographics

Historical evolution of the population of the province:

Government 

The provincial government is divided into three branches: the executive, headed by a popularly elected governor, who appoints the cabinet; the legislative; and the judiciary, headed by the Supreme Court.

Political division
The province is divided into nine departments (departamentos).

Source for department names:

Villages
 

 Desaguadero

References

External links
 
 Provincia de San Luis - Official website (in Spanish)
 Argentour: San Luis Province

 
Provinces of Argentina
States and territories established in 1820